New York State Route 304 (NY 304), also known as "Rockland County Clerk Paul Piperato Memorial Highway", as well as Pearl Street for its first half a mile and Main Street for other parts, is a north–south state highway located in central Rockland County, New York, in the United States. The  route begins at the New Jersey–New York border in Pearl River and ends at an intersection with U.S. Route 9W (US 9W) in the community of Congers. The route is a main route through Rockland County, intersecting NY 59 and indirectly connecting to the New York State Thruway and the Palisades Interstate Parkway (PIP) in Nanuet. NY 304 has three distinct sections: a freeway that extends from Pearl River to Nanuet, an at-grade section between Nanuet and New City, and a surface bypass linking New City to Haverstraw.

NY 304 was assigned in 1930, originally following a series of at-grade roads that loosely parallel its modern alignment between Pearl River and Haverstraw. Concerns over the route's ability to handle a projected 40,000 vehicles per day in 1980 led to the construction of new highways south of Nanuet and north of New City in the mid-1960s. Most of NY 304's old alignment through these areas is now maintained by Rockland County as part of several county routes.

Route description

NY 304 begins at the New Jersey–New York border in Pearl River. South of the border is Montvale in Bergen County, in which NY 304 continues as County Route 503 (CR 503), known as Kinderkamack Road in Bergen County. From its southern terminus at the state border to its interchange with Washington Ave about a half a mile up, it is also known as Pearl Street. NY 304 quickly becomes a four-lane road intersecting CR 33 and CR 30 in Pearl River. CR 33 provides a link to the downtown business district of Pearl River via Central Avenue. After its intersection with CR 30, NY 304 becomes a limited-access highway. The latter exit indirectly connects NY 304 with the PIP and the New York State Thruway (Interstate 87 or I-87 and I-287).

At its intersection with former NY 59A (West Nyack Road), NY 304 reverts to being a four-lane, full access road. NY 304 does not connect to either of the highways; instead, the Thruway and the PIP connect to each other by way of a large cloverleaf interchange along the eastern side of NY 304. The route continues north, entering the hamlet of New City as the highway intersects CR 27 (Germonds Road). NY 304 provides a link to the downtown business district of New City at its intersection with Main Street one block to the north.

North of this location, NY 304 gains a  speed limit as it passes through several at-grade intersections. The road narrows to two lanes at a junction with CR 80, but stays a  road. Finally, after crossing CR 23 in north New City, NY 304 makes its final push toward its northern terminus at an intersection with US 9W just inside the Haverstraw town line. The intersection between NY 304 and US 9W is less than one mile (1.6 km) north of the intersection of NY 303 and US 9W, which also serves as NY 303's northern terminus.

History

NY 304 was assigned as part of the 1930 renumbering of state highways in New York. The route was originally an at-grade highway for its entire length, following what is now East Washington Avenue (CR 35), Middletown Road (CR 33) from Pearl River, and Main Street to West Nyack Road (then NY 59) in Nanuet. Here, NY 304 turned east, overlapping with NY 59 to access its current alignment. Farther north, NY 304 originally utilized North Main Street (CR 29) in New City and South Mountain (CR 90) roads from New City to US 202 in Garnerville. NY 304 was realigned slightly in the early 1940s to follow East Central Avenue in Pearl River and the overlap with NY 59 was eliminated in the mid-1950s when NY 59 was moved onto a new highway paralleling West Nyack Road to the south.

Street traffic forecasters for the Rockland County Planning Department predicted in 1960 that the section of the road between Pearl River and Nanuet would serve 30–40,000 vehicles per day in 1980. Since the road would not be able to sustain that amount, a new bypass between the two locations was opened in the mid-1960s as a realignment of NY 304. The bypass, which extended from Central Avenue in Pearl River to West Nyack Road in Nanuet, handles about 23,000 cars per day as of 2008. The Pearl River–Nanuet bypass was part of a larger plan to build a freeway extending from Pearl River to Haverstraw at Hook Mountain State Park; however, the section of the route north of Nanuet was cancelled as the county's 1980 traffic volume projection for the Nanuet–Haverstraw corridor was not high enough to justify the construction of a new highway.

Although the plans for a Nanuet–Haverstraw freeway were scrapped, NY 304 was ultimately moved onto a new, mostly at-grade highway between the two locations in the mid-1960s. The new alignment utilized the pre-existing Long Clove Road near the northern tip of DeForest Lake and a newly built road bypassing New City to the east and running generally northeasterly to the junction of Ridge and Long Clove roads. The northernmost part of NY 304 was realigned in the 1980s to follow a new highway paralleling Long Clove Road to the south.

Major intersections

See also

References

External links

304
Transportation in Rockland County, New York
Limited-access roads in New York (state)